Askavaq (also Romanized as Oskūq; also known as Eskara, Eskyava, and Sakūq) is a village in Kaghazkonan-e Shomali Rural District, Kaghazkonan District, Meyaneh County, East Azerbaijan Province, Iran. At the 2006 census, its population was 94, in 24 families.

References 

Populated places in Meyaneh County